Shang Wenjie (born 22 December 1982), also known as Laure Shang, is a Chinese singer-songwriter and the champion of the third season of the Chinese singing contest Super Girl (or Super Voice Girl). In 2011, she also won the award for Best Female Singer at the annual MusicRadio China TOP Charts Awards.

Early life
Laure Shang majored in French in Fudan University.

Career

2006: Beginnings
In May, Shang participated in the third Super Girl, and finally won 5,196,975 votes in the final, the highest number of votes in its history. She wrote a travel essay, entitled "Parallel with the Dream - XiaoSanr in France." sharing her feelings when she visited France two years ago.

2010-2011: Rising popularity
In June 2010, Shang sang the theme song "23 Seconds, 32 Years " for Feng Xiaogang's film Aftershock. In September, Shang was selected as representative for China Youth Association and China Student Union Association. She was also invited by Belgium Government to perform for King of Belgium, and the song "Our Song" was selected as the best song in Shanghai Expo. More than 150 million people downloaded the song from Shanghai Expo official website. In October, Shang was invited by Canada Government to perform at Sino-Canada 40 Years Anniversary. The Canadian Prime Minister personally invited Shang to his office to have a talk on Sino-Canada relationships.

In November, Shang released her new album "Fashion Icon". In December, Shang's first Remix Album was kicked off in Japan and Korea market.

In January 2011, Shang announced her first fashion brand "Ma Puce", and her new foreign language album "Nightmare". In February, Shang and Lara Fabian sang the song J'y Crois Encore at Spring Festival Global Gala 2011 in China. In April, Shang won Best Female Singer title in MusicRadio China Top Anniversary. Shang was then invited by the Fifth Arts Annual Anniversary to perform at the Forbidden City in Beijing.

In August, Shang released her new album "In". Mr. Brett Rierson, representative of World Food Programme China Area, and Xu Nan, Public Affairs Officer of World Food Programme, attended the event. Shang received the honorary certificate from World Food Program for her contribution to the Anti-Starving Project.

In September, Shang was invited by One Young World Summit to write a song "Amazing Life" for One Young World Summit held in Zurich, Switzerland. Shang won China's version of Pop Idol with the highest number of votes in the history of the competition. Shang was also invited by French Government as the spokeswoman for China French Language Year. Shang wrote a song for fashion magazine L'OFFICIEL, "A L'OFFICIEL", in three languages: Chinese, French and English.

2013
In September, Shang became the host of the fourth season of modelling reality show, China's Next Top Model.

2018
In December, Shang joined Chinese EDM talent show Rave Now as a mentor.

Discography

Albums and EPs 
 (2007.06.06) À la claire fontaine (梦之浮桥) (EP)
 (2007.10.22) Beneath Van Gogh's Starry Sky (在梵高的星空下)
 (2007.12.25) About Us (关于我们) (Cover Album)
 (2009.10.10) Time Lady (时代女性)
 (2010.11.18) Fashion Icon (全球风靡)
 (2011.01.24) Nightmare (魔)
 (2011.08.28) IN
 (2012.08.22) Ode To The Doom (最後的讚歌)
 (2013.11.07) Graceland (恩賜之地)
 (2016.12.05) Black & Golden (黑金)
 (2018.08.24) The Puzzle Pieces
 (2020.08.24) Chanting Verses (咏) (EP)

Other albums 
 (2010.12.21) Ma Puce (Mini Remix Album)
 (2011.12.21) w in win (Demo Album)
 (2012.07.20) Before The Doom (Bonus EP)
 (2016.09.12) Black & Golden. Pure (Instrumental Album)
 (2017.01.10) The Black Remix (Remix Album)
 (2017.02.xx) The Golden Collection (The Best of Album)

Singles

Concert
 Share With Laure·Beijing (尚佳分享·尚雯婕2008北京演唱会) Mar.1st, 2008
 Share With Laure·ShenZhen (唇感受·心聆听·尚雯婕2008深圳演唱会) Oct.18th, 2008
 Share With Laure·ShangHai (天籁倾城·尚雯婕2009上海交响音乐会) Jan.9th, 2009
 三色艾雷迪·ShangHai (尚雯婕2009全国巡演·北京中山音乐堂) Nov.13th, 2009
 三色艾雷迪·ShangHai (尚雯婕2009全国巡演·成都锦城艺术宫) Nov.28th, 2009
 三色艾雷迪·ShangHai (尚雯婕2009全国巡演·上海东方艺术中心) Dec.6th, 2009
 三色艾雷迪·ShangHai (尚雯婕2009全国巡演·广州中山纪念堂) Dec.12th, 2009

Book
 Walk With Dream—Laure at France (与梦平行-小三儿在法兰西)

Translation
 La petite fille de Monsieur Linh (林先生的小孙女) /Author:Philippe Claudel /Release: Jan. 1st, 2009/YiLin Press/ China

References

1982 births
Living people
Singers from Shanghai
Super Girl contestants
Fudan University alumni